Strawberry Park is a  campground located in Preston, Connecticut. The campsite offers water, electricity, wireless internet access, and cable TV connection. Sewer and electrical connections are available as well as log cabin and rv rentals.

References

External links
Strawberry Park

Campgrounds in the United States
Preston, Connecticut
Parks in New London County, Connecticut